Vermont State Hospital, alternately known as the Vermont State Asylum for the Insane and the Waterbury Asylum, was a mental institution built in 1890 in Waterbury, Vermont to help relieve overcrowding at the privately run Vermont Asylum for the Insane in Brattleboro, Vermont, now known as the Brattleboro Retreat. Originally intended to treat the criminally insane, the hospital eventually took in patients with a wide variety of problems, including mild to severe mental disabilities, epilepsy, depression, alcoholism and senility. The hospital campus, much of which now houses other state offices, was listed on the National Register of Historic Places in 2016. Partly as a replacement for this facility, the state currently operates the 25 bed Vermont Psychiatric Care Hospital in Berlin, Vermont.

History
During the tenure of Dr. Eugene A. Stanley as superintendent (1918–1936), the hospital expanded – with a patient population peaking at 1,728 in the mid-1930s – and constructed a new three-story building specifically for the treatment of women. Stanley, who was an advocate of eugenics, espoused forced sterilization and advised the Eugenics Society, to whom he provided patient records.

The word, "Waterbury," used in a derogatory sense, was intended to convey to the listener that someone was either insane or was acting or talking in a manner disagreeable to the speaker (e.g. "Keep that up, and we'll be sending you to Waterbury.")

The property was flooded in 1927.

In 1963, the population started to decline. Empty floor space was converted into state offices.

Operations
The hospital was closed due to flooding in the aftermath of Tropical Storm Irene in Vermont.

Facilities
In 2012, the property covered .

See also
Brandon Training School
Brattleboro Retreat
National Register of Historic Places listings in Washington County, Vermont

References

External links
Official website

Hospital buildings completed in 1891
Psychiatric hospitals in Vermont
Buildings and structures in Waterbury, Vermont
Historic districts on the National Register of Historic Places in Vermont
National Register of Historic Places in Washington County, Vermont
Defunct hospitals in the United States
1891 establishments in Vermont